Mustafa Pasha Mosque is an Ottoman-era mosque located in the Old Bazaar of Skopje, North Macedonia.

History
The structure stands on a plateau above the old bazaar, built in 1492 by Çoban Mustafa Pasha, who later became vizier on the court of Sultan Selim I (1512-1520). The mosque is largely intact from its original state, and no additions have been made through the years. The body of Umi, the daughter of Mustafa Pasha, is entombed in the türbe next to the mosque. The mosque has a rose garden.

A five-year renovation of the mosque, funded by the Turkish government, was completed in August 2011.

Gallery

References

Ottoman mosques in North Macedonia
Buildings and structures in Skopje
Religious buildings and structures completed in 1492
Old Bazaar, Skopje